Salem Historic District or variations with Downtown or Old may refer to:

in the United States
(by state)
Salem Historic District (Salem, Connecticut), listed on the National Register of Historic Places (NRHP) in New London County, Connecticut
Salem Downtown Historic District (Salem, Indiana)
Downtown Salem District, Salem, Massachusetts
Salem Common Historic District (Salem, Massachusetts)
Salem Common Historic District (Salem, New Hampshire), listed on the NRHP in Rockingham County, New Hampshire
Salem Historic District (New York)
Old Salem Historic District, Winston-Salem, North Carolina
West Salem Historic District, Winston-Salem, North Carolina, listed on the NRHP in Forsyth County, North Carolina
Salem Downtown Historic District (Salem, Ohio)
Salem Downtown State Street – Commercial Street Historic District, Salem, Oregon
Downtown Salem Historic District (Salem, South Dakota), listed on the NRHP in McCook County, South Dakota
Downtown Salem Historic District (Salem, Virginia), listed on the NRHP in Virginia
Salem Historic District (Salem, West Virginia)